The Museum of armoured vehicles Smržovka is a museum of military vehicles located in the Czech Republic about 4 kilometers east of Jablonec nad Nisou and about 95 kilometers north-east of Prague. The museum represents the largest private tank collection in Central Europe.

Tank Collection 

Cromwell, Comet, Charioteer, Centurion, AMX-13, M36 Jackson, M3A1 Stuart, T-34/85, T-55, T-72, IS-2 (borrowed from Military museum Lešany)

Other Vehicles 

OT-810, Ferret Mk.I, CCKW 353, WC-51, M16 Half-track, VT-34, VT-55, Praga V3S, SD-100, VP-90, M53/59 Praga

References

Military and war museums in the Czech Republic
Tank museums